"I Wanted to Tell Her" is a single by American industrial band Ministry. Written by frontman Al Jourgensen and guest singer Shay Jones, and co-produced by Vince Ely and Ian Taylor, it was released as the second single from Ministry's debut studio album, With Sympathy (1983). Previously, the song first appeared as "Primental", an instrumental released in 1981 as part of Ministry's debut single, "I'm Falling / Cold Life".

Reception
"I Wanted to Tell Her" is one of the most popular songs from With Sympathy, charting on both the US Dance and NZ charts. The song was picked as an AllMusic reviewer's pick.

Track listing
7" Vinyl (US)
 "I Wanted to Tell Her" (edit) – 3:55
 "A Walk In the Park" – 4:58

7" Vinyl (US promo)
 "I Wanted to Tell Her" (edit) – 3:55
 "I Wanted to Tell Her" (mono) – 3:55

12" Maxi-single (US)
 "I Wanted to Tell Her" (remix) – 6:57
 "I Wanted to Tell Her" (dub) – 4:45
 "Effigy" – 3:51
 "Revenge" – 3:48

7" Vinyl (UK)
 "I Wanted to Tell Her" (remix edit) – 3:57
 "I Wanted to Tell Her" (Tongue-Tied remix) – 4:45

12" Vinyl (EU)
 "I Wanted to Tell Her" (remix) – 6:57
 "I Wanted to Tell Her" (Tongue-Tied remix) – 4:45

12" Maxi-single (EU)
 "I Wanted to Tell Her" (remix) – 6:57
 "I Wanted to Tell Her" (Tongue-Tied remix) – 4:45
 "A Walk In the Park" – 4:58

NOTE: Although not listed as such on the sleeves, all 12" versions (as well as the UK 7") use an alternate performance of the song that differs from the one on With Sympathy. 
The Tongue-Tied Mix and Dub version are the same.

Covers
The song was covered in 2011 by electronic duo Holy Ghost!, with support from The Juan MacLean and female vocals handled by Nancy Whang.

Charts

Personnel
Ministry 
 Alain Jourgensen – vocals, guitar, keyboards
 Stephen George – drums

Additional personnel
 Robert Roberts – keyboards
 Shay Jones – feature vocals
 John Davis – keyboards
 Walter Turbitt – guitar
 Martin Sorenson – bass guitar

References

1983 singles
1982 songs
Ministry (band) songs
Arista Records singles
Songs written by Al Jourgensen